Lee Arlo Wykoff, often misspelled as "Wyckoff", (March 10, 1898 - April 2, 1974) was a professional wrestler in the United States. Throughout his career he wrestled for various U.S. based territorial promotions including the St. Louis Wrestling Club (SLWC), Gulf Athletic Club (GAC), NWA Hollywood Wrestling, Atlantic Athletic Commission (AAC) and Midwest Wrestling Association.

Early life 
Lee Wykoff was born in Mayetta, KS to Charles and Ethel (Haynes) Wykoff on March 10, 1898. Charles Wykoff was a blacksmith. The family settled in Osborne, Kansas in 1908 where Lee attended school.

Collegiate sports career 
Wykoff was a member of Student Army Training Corps (S.A.T.C.) at Washburn University in Topeka, KS.

Wykoff played football for Washburn from 1918 to 1920. He was named all-state fullback in 1919 and 1920.

Professional football career 
Wykoff played in the National Football League for the St. Louis All-Stars in 1923.

Professional wrestling career 
A skilled wrestler, Wykoff had exceptional shooting skills. His signature finishing move was a stepover toehold.

In his career, Wykoff wrestled for the St. Louis Wrestling Club (SLWC), Gulf Athletic Club (GAC), NWA Hollywood Wrestling, Atlantic Athletic Commission (AAC), and MWA. He is best remembered for his tenure with the MWA where he was a four-time MWA World Heavyweight champion. He had many memorable bouts within the MWA against Orville Brown.

In 1931, Wykoff defeated NFL player Father Lumpkin in the Cleveland, OH Equestrium with two straight falls.

Wykoff and Ed "Strangler" Lewis matched up in a shoot contest on August 13, 1936, at the Hippodrome in New York City. The match went 2 hours and 14 minutes before both wrestlers fell from the ring and were counted out.

In an early wrestler vs. boxer match up, Wykoff defeated boxer Harry Thomas in April 1938 in Kansas City.

Wykoff won the MWA World Heavyweight Title (Kansas City) in April 1941 by defeating Orville Brown at Memorial Hall in Kansas City. Wykoff held the title for 182 days before losing it back to his nemesis Brown.

In January 1943, Wykoff regained the MWA World Heavyweight Title (Kansas City) from Ed "Strangler" Lewis. Wykoff lost the title to Orville Brown 35 days later. Wykoff would regain the title later in 1943 before losing it to Brown once again.

Wykoff defeated Dave Levin for the MWA World Heavyweight Title (Kansas City) in June 1944. Orville Brown defeated Wykoff 48 days later to claim the title.

Personal life 
Wykoff married Nada Belle Henrietta Hayes on February 17, 1920, in Topeka. Two children were born to the couple; Dorothy Louise Wykoff Wilber and Robert Lee Wykoff. Robert died in an auto accident in 1930 at the age of 4. Nada Belle died in 1935. Lee then married Eleanor Wykoff.

Championships and accomplishments 
Midwest Wrestling Association
 MWA World Heavyweight Championship (4 times)
Kansas Heavyweight Championship (1 time)

References

External links 
 

1898 births
1974 deaths
American male professional wrestlers
People from Jackson County, Kansas
Professional wrestlers from Kansas
Washburn University alumni
St. Louis All-Stars players